The 2002 Morocco Cup was a three-team cricket tournament which took place in Tangier, Morocco during August 2002. The tournament was the first occasion on which the highest level of international cricket had been played in North Africa. Pakistan, South Africa and Sri Lanka competed in the competition, which was funded by Abdul Rahman Bukhatir, a wealthy business man from the United Arab Emirates. Sri Lanka beat South Africa in the final to scoop the $250,000 prize money.

The tournament, in addition to attracting TV audiences to Bukhatir's TEN Sports channel, promoted cricket in North Africa. All of the matches were played at the National Cricket Stadium in Tangier, a purpose built ground which cost $4 million, most of which was spent on the grandstand. The organisers of the competition were so keen to avoid any accusations of match-fixing that they installed closed-circuit television (CCTV) cameras in the team dressing rooms. 

During the group stage, Pakistan won only once; beating Sri Lanka in the second match of the tournament. Sri Lanka beat Pakistan in their other match, and defeated South Africa in both the side's group contests to finish top of the table. South Africa won both their matches against Pakistan to qualify for the final. In the final, Sri Lanka beat South Africa by 27 runs, led by a run-a-ball score of 71 from their captain Sanath Jayasuriya, and two wickets from each of Chaminda Vaas, Pulasthi Gunaratne and Muttiah Muralitharan.

Jayasuriya finished the tournament as the leading run-scorer, aggregating 299 runs from his five appearances at an average of 59.80. Each of the top-three run-scorers were Sri Lankan; the highest Pakistani batsman was Yousuf Youhana whose 153 runs placed him fourth, while South African Jacques Kallis was fifth with 141 runs. In contrast, Waqar Younis of Pakistan took the most wickets, 11, followed by a pair of South Africans – Allan Donald and Lance Klusener, who took 10 and 9 respectively. Upul Chandana and Pulasthi Gunaratne were the leading Sri Lankans, claiming 8 wickets apiece.

Group stage

Table
Key: Pld = Played, W = Wins, L = Losses, Pts = Points, NRR = Net run rate.

Notes:
Teams marked  progressed to the final of the competition.

Fixtures

1st match

2nd match

3rd match

4th match

5th match

6th match

Final

References

External links

Morocco Cup, 2002
International cricket competitions in 2002
Cricket in Morocco
2002 in Moroccan sport